Azusa Unified School District is a public unified school district based in Azusa, California, in Los Angeles County, California, United States. The district serves students in Azusa, the northwestern portion of Covina, parts of southeast Irwindale, the northern portion of Vincent, most of Citrus, and the western portion of Glendora. The Board of Education is composed of five members, elected at large, serving a four-year term. The elections are held on a Tuesday after the first Monday in November of even-numbered years starting with the 2018 election.

Schools

Elementary schools
 Henry Dalton
 Victor Hodge
 Charles Lee
 Longfellow (Pre K–Kindergarten)
 Magnolia
 Clifford Murray
 Paramount
 W. R. Powell
 Valleydale

Middle schools
 Center
 Foothill
 Slauson

K-8 schools
 Alice M. Ellington School

High schools
 Azusa High School
 Gladstone High School
 Sierra High School (California)

Adult School
 Azusa Adult Education Center

School closures
In recent years, due to declining enrollment rates, Azusa has been closing schools. Gladstone Street Elementary School and Mountain View Elementary both closed in 2019. After the 2022-2023 school year, Azusa will drastically reorganize the school district to merge more students into a smaller amount of schools. All middle school-aged students will go to Gladstone High School, which will become a middle school, and all high school-aged students will go to Azusa High School. All existing middle schools in Azusa will close, as well as Azusa's only K-8 school, Alice M. Ellington Elementary. Powell Elementary School will close as well.

References

External links
 
 

Azusa, California
Education in Los Angeles County, California
School districts in Los Angeles County, California